Gilbert Bennion (1 October 1898 – 27 January 2005) was, at age 106, one of the last surviving Australian veterans of World War I.

Biography
Born in Croydon, North Queensland, he was an apprentice railway station master in Townsville when he enlisted on 1 August 1918 to serve in the Australian Imperial Force. He trained at Enoggera, was promoted to corporal, and was discharged without serving overseas. Not having been to Croydon in six years, he visited home to bid farewell to his parents, but by the time his stay was over two or three days later, the boat carrying his unit had sailed for New Zealand.

In peacetime, Bennion was an officer in the Citizens Military Force. He also rejoined Queensland Rail and was the last stationmaster at Tweed Heads station.

Honours
Bennion received the 80th Anniversary Armistice Remembrance Medal in 2000, and the Centenary Medal in 2002.

Death
Bennion was the last remaining New South Wales Australian veteran of World War I, and died at the age of 106 on January 27, 2005.

References

1898 births
2005 deaths
Australian centenarians
Australian military personnel of World War I
Men centenarians
Recipients of the Centenary Medal
People from New South Wales
People from North West Queensland
Australian Army soldiers